Can't Get Started is the third EP released by You Am I, in October 1992. It was You Am I's first release on Ra Records, a sub-branch of rooArt Records.

Track listing 
All songs: Rogers/You Am I

 "Grand Ted"
 "Rational Hell"
 "Goddamn"
 "IOU2"
 "Frog"

Personnel

 Tim Rogers - vocals, guitar
 Andy Kent - bass, backing vocals
 Mark Tunaley - drums

1992 EPs
You Am I albums